Saragiolo is a village in Tuscany, central Italy, administratively a frazione of the comune of Piancastagnaio, province of Siena. At the time of the 2001 census its population was 369.

Saragiolo is about 90 km from Siena and 5 km from Piancastagnaio.

References 

Frazioni of the Province of Siena